Berra is a surname. Notable people with the surname include:

Christophe Berra (born 1985), Scottish football player
Dale Berra (born 1956), American baseball player and son of Yogi Berra
Reto Berra (born 1987), Swiss hockey player
Steve Berra (born 1973), American skateboarder
Tim Berra (biologist) (born 1943), American biologist and author
Tim Berra (American football) (born 1951), American football player and son of Yogi Berra
Yogi Berra (1925–2015), American baseball player and manager